Kuala Lumpur Dragons is a professional basketball team based in Kuala Lumpur, Malaysia that currently plays in the ASEAN Basketball League. It also played as the Blustar Detergent Dragons in the Philippines' PBA Developmental League in 2016.

History 
In their first year of existence, they were known as the KL Dragons before becoming the Westports KL Dragons after a sponsorship deal with Westports. Before the 2012 season, the team became the Westports Malaysia Dragons.

Malaysia has made the ABL semifinals in all of its first four seasons in the league but lost all four times in the semi-finals: the AirAsia Philippine Patriots in its first two semi-finals appearances, the San Miguel Beermen in its third year, and to the Indonesia Warriors in its fourth semi-final appearance. But, in the 2014 season, the Dragons made it all the way to the finals before losing to Hi-Tech Bangkok City in the finals.

In 2011, the Dragons was the ABL representative in the 2011 FIBA Asia Champions Cup held in the Philippines after the champion Chang Thailand Slammers failed to make it because of a suspension by FIBA. KL failed to win a single game in the tourney.

The team won the 2015–16 ASEAN Basketball League season and qualify for the 2016 FIBA Asia Champions Cup. They entered the 2016 PBA D-League Foundation Cup under the name Blustar Detergent Dragons. The Dragons again failed to win a single game in the tourney.

The team changed its name to the Kuala Lumpur Dragons for the 2019–20 ASEAN Basketball League season.

Achievements

ASEAN Basketball League

FIBA Asia Champions Cup

Season by season

Team officials 
Team owners:
  Datuk Wira Dani Daim
  Datuk Robin Tan Yeong Ching
  Datuk Ruben Gnanalingam

Team President:
  Datuk Wira Dani Daim

Roster

Notable players 
To appear in this section a player must have either:
- Set a club record or won an individual award as a professional player.
- Played at least one official international match for his senior national team at any time.

Imports 

    Will Artino
  Calvin Godfrey - MVP
  Reggie Johnson - MVP
  Keefe Grimes - 6TH MAN OF THE YEAR
  Brian Williams - MVP
   Jason Brickman
   Joshua Munzon
   Moala Tautuaa
   Matthew Wright

Malaysians

  Cheng Wah Chin
  Zhi Shin Chin
  Wei Hong Choo	
  Batumalai Guganeswaran
  Yee Tong Heng	
  Tian Yuan Kuek
  Satyaseelan Kuppusamy	
  Yoong Jing Kwaan
  Shee Fai Loh
  Chee Kheun Ma
  Lok San Mak
  Ban Sin Ooi	
  Ng Sing Tee	
  Kok Hou Teo	
  Chun Hong Ting
  Wen Keong Tong
  Chuan Chin Wee
  Chee Li Wei
  Yi Hou Wong
  Wee Seng Wong	
  Ivan Yeo

Coaches 
  Goh Cheng Huat (2009–11; 2016)
  Ariel Vanguardia (2011–16)
  Chris Thomas (2016–2018)
  Jamie Pearlman (2018–2020)

References

External links 

 
 Malaysian basketball on Asia-Basket.com website

ASEAN Basketball League teams
Basketball teams in Malaysia
Basketball teams established in 2009
PBA Developmental League teams
2009 establishments in Malaysia